The 1959 Prince Edward Island general election was held in the Canadian province of Prince Edward Island on September 1, 1959.

The governing Liberals of Premier Alex W. Matheson were defeated by the Progressive Conservatives led by Walter R. Shaw, who gained a massive number of districts across the Island to earn a majority government, despite a close result in the popular vote.

The defeat of the Matheson-led Liberals marked the end of the longest serving government in Island history. The Liberals had governed for 24 straight years since their initial victory in the 1935 general election, a feat that would not be rivaled by any other provincial government on the Island.

Party Standings

Members Elected

The Legislature of Prince Edward Island had two levels of membership from 1893 to 1996 - Assemblymen and Councillors. This was a holdover from when the Island had a bicameral legislature, the General Assembly and the Legislative Council.

In 1893, the Legislative Council was abolished and had its membership merged with the Assembly, though the two titles remained separate and were elected by different electoral franchises. Assembleymen were elected by all eligible voters of within a district, while Councillors were only elected by landowners within a district.

Kings

Queens

Prince

Sources

1959 elections in Canada
Elections in Prince Edward Island
1959 in Prince Edward Island
September 1959 events in Canada